In cryptography, the OpenPGP card is an ISO/IEC 7816-4, -8 compatible smart card that is integrated with many OpenPGP functions. Using this smart card, various cryptographic tasks (encryption, decryption, digital signing/verification, authentication etc.) can be performed. It allows secure storage of secret key material; all versions of the protocol state, "Private keys and passwords cannot be read from the card with any command or function." However, new key pairs may be loaded onto the card at any time, overwriting the existing ones.

The original OpenPGP card was built on BasicCard, and remains available at retail. Several mutually compatible JavaCard implementations of the OpenPGP Card's interface protocol are available as open source software and can be installed on generic JavaCard smart cards, including NFC-enabled cards. Nitrokey and Yubico provide USB tokens implementing the same protocol through smart card emulation.

The smart card daemon, in combination with the supported smart card readers, as implemented in GnuPG, can be used for many cryptographic applications. With gpg-agent in GnuPG 2, an ssh-agent implementation using GnuPG, an OpenPGP card can be used for SSH authentication also.

Vendor IDs 

An OpenPGP card features a unique serial number to allow software to ask for a specific card.  Serial numbers are assigned on a vendor basis and vendors are registered with the FSFE.

Assigned vendor ids are:

References 

Smart cards
OpenPGP